French corazon is the eleventh album by experimental French singer Brigitte Fontaine, released in 1988 on the EMI label. It was originally released in Japan only, but was finally released in France in 1990. It was also re-released under the title Le Nougat in 1999, after the most well-known song from the album, which was the closest Fontaine would ever have to a hit, and without the original title track.

The original album cover was a photograph by Peter Lindbergh. It has been replaced on the Le Nougat release by a drawing by Olivia Clavel, who had also directed the videoclip for Le Nougat.

Track listing

Bonus track on 1993 reissue

References 

Brigitte Fontaine albums
1988 albums